Highway 732 is a highway in the Canadian province of Saskatchewan. It runs from Highway 627 to Highway 2 near Penzance.

Highway 732 also connects with Highways 643 and 11, near Craik.

See also 
Roads in Saskatchewan
Transportation in Saskatchewan

References 

732